Luc Lamirault (born 12 May 1962) is a French politician who has been Member of Parliament for Eure-et-Loir's 3rd constituency since 2021.

References 

1962 births
Living people
Politicians from Chartres
The Republicans (France) politicians
Agir (France) politicians
Horizons politicians
Deputies of the 15th National Assembly of the French Fifth Republic
Deputies of the 16th National Assembly of the French Fifth Republic